The men's doubles event at the 2019 African Games was held from 24 to 29 August at the Cheminots Club.

Wisdom Na-Adjrago and George Darko are the defending champion, but they doesn't participate in this year event.

Medalists

Seeds

Draw

Finals

Top half

Bottom half

References

External links
 Draw

Tennis at the 2019 African Games